Benedict Rattigan (born 1965) is an English writer and documentary film-maker. As a television producer, he has made films for the BBC, NBC, C4 and Granada Television. In addition to publishing two books, he has written articles for periodicals from The Philosopher to Time Out. In 2006, he founded the UK branch of The Schweitzer Institute, campaigning on issues relating to animal welfare, human rights and the environment.

He was educated at Eton College (’79-’83) and Oxford University (’92-’93), where he read philosophy. The son of the royal portrait painter Michael Noakes and the writer and academic Vivien Noakes. he legally adopted the surname Rattigan in 2015.

A friend of Paul McCartney and Heather Mills, his phone was allegedly hacked on numerous occasions by Glenn Mulcaire at the time of the McCartneys' divorce in 2006. He is one of 46 claimants who brought a claim for compensation against Mulcaire and News International in April 2012.

References 

1965 births
Living people
People educated at Eton College
Alumni of the University of Oxford
English documentary filmmakers
People associated with the News International phone hacking scandal